The 2007 Portland Timbers season was the 7th season for the Portland Timbers—the 3rd incarnation of a club to bear the Timbers name—of the now-defunct USL First Division, the second-tier league of the United States and Canada at the time.

Preseason

Regular season

April

May

June

July

August

September

Postseason

Competitions

USL First Division

Standings

Results summary

Results by round

USL-1 Playoffs

Playoff bracket
Each round except the final was a two-game aggregate goal series decided by extra time and a penalty shoot-out immediately following the second game of the series, if necessary. The away goals rule was not used as a tie-breaker. Tournament was re-seeded after the quarterfinals.

Quarterfinals

Semifinals

U.S. Open Cup

Cup bracket

First round

Second round

Cascadia Cup

Club 
<div style="float:left; width:47%;">

Coaching staff

Top scorers
Players with 1 goal or more included only.

Disciplinary record 
Players with 1 card or more included only.

Goalkeeper stats 
All goalkeepers included.

Player movement

Transfers in

Transfers out

Unsigned draft picks

Notes

2007
American soccer clubs 2007 season
2007 in sports in Oregon
2007 in Portland, Oregon